This is a list of IIHF World Rankings from its inception in 2003. The IIHF World Ranking is a ranking of the performance of the national ice hockey teams of member countries of the International Ice Hockey Federation (IIHF). It is based on a formula giving points for each team's placings at IIHF-sanctioned tournaments over the previous four years. The ranking is used to determine seedings and qualification requirements for future IIHF tournaments.

The system was approved at the IIHF congress of September 2003. According to IIHF President René Fasel, the system was designed to be simple to understand and "reflect the long-term quality of all national hockey programs and their commitment to international hockey".

Men's 

Seven nations have achieved a top ten ranking every time (including Olympic rankings) between 2003–2022, they are (in order of average ranking): Canada, Sweden, Russia, Finland, Czech Republic, the United States, and Switzerland. An additional five nations, Slovakia (twenty-three times), Germany (seventeen times), Latvia (fourteen times), Belarus (nine times), Norway (eight times), and Denmark (once) have been in the top ten at least once.

As of the 2022 Olympics, four countries have accomplished a first-place ranking: Canada thirteen times, Sweden six times, Russia four times, and Finland once. Czech Republic and Canada are the only nations to have achieved a top-six ranking every time, and Canada the only nation to achieve a top-five ranking every time.

While Finland has achieved a first-place ranking only once, it holds the record for having the most total ranking points ever in the history of the IIHF, setting the record at 4130 total points after winning the Mens 2022 World Championship. The previous record of 4105 total points was held by Canada after the 2010 Olympics.

2003–10

2011–18

2019–

Women's

Only six nations have achieved a top ten ranking every time between 2003–2022. These nations are (in order of average ranking): Canada, the United States, Finland, Sweden, Russia, and Switzerland. An additional ten nations, Germany (twenty-one times), Japan (twenty times), Czech Republic (twelve times), Kazakhstan (ten times), China (nine times), Slovakia (five times), France (three times), Denmark (three times), Norway (twice), Austria (twice), and Hungary (once) have been in the top ten at least once.

As of 2022, only two countries have accomplished a first-place ranking: Canada twelve times and the United States ten times. Canada, Finland and the United States are the only nations to have achieved a top-four ranking every time, with Canada and the United States never falling below a top-two ranking.

In December 2017, six Russian women hockey players were found to have committed doping violations at the 2014 Winter Olympics. The IOC disqualified the Russian team from the 2014 hockey tournament and the IIHF was requested to modify the results accordingly. The information in this historical section does not reflect any changes that the IIHF may make in the record.

2003–10

2011–18

2019–

References

Specific

General
2003 ranking: 
2004 ranking: 
2005 ranking: 
Feb 2006 ranking: 
May 2006 ranking:

External Links
World Rankings from 2007 to 2018 at IIHF.com
Women's World Ranking for 2019 at IIHF.com
Men's World Ranking for 2019 at IIHF.com
Women's World Ranking for 2021 at IIHF.com
Men's World Ranking for 2021 at IIHF.com
Men's World Ranking for 2022 at IIHF.com
Women's World Ranking for 2022 at IIHF.com
World Ranking for the current year at IIHF.com

International Ice Hockey Federation
Ice hockey statistics
2003 introductions